Jana Novotná and Arantxa Sánchez Vicario were the defending champions but lost in the quarterfinals to Martina Hingis and Helena Suková.

Hingis and Suková defeated Meredith McGrath and Larisa Neiland in the final, 5–7, 7–5, 6–1 to win the ladies' doubles tennis title at the 1996 Wimbledon Championships. At 15 Years 282 Days, Hingis became the youngest ever grand slam champion. It was the 1st Grand Slam (doubles) title and the 2nd title overall for Hingis, and the 9th and final Grand Slam doubles title and the 64th title overall for Suková, in their respective careers.

Seeds

  Jana Novotná /  Arantxa Sánchez Vicario (quarterfinals)
  Gigi Fernández /  Natasha Zvereva (semifinals)
  Lindsay Davenport /  Mary Joe Fernández (quarterfinals, retired)
  Meredith McGrath /  Larisa Neiland (final)
 n/a
  Nicole Arendt /  Manon Bollegraf (third round)
  Lori McNeil /  Nathalie Tauziat (second round)
  Martina Hingis /  Helena Suková (champions)
  Lisa Raymond /  Rennae Stubbs (third round)
  Katrina Adams /  Mariaan de Swardt (quarterfinals)
  Kristie Boogert /  Irina Spîrlea (third round)
  Yayuk Basuki /  Caroline Vis (quarterfinals)
  Conchita Martínez /  Patricia Tarabini (third round)
  Alexia Dechaume-Balleret /  Sandrine Testud (third round, retired)
  Elizabeth Smylie /  Linda Wild (semifinals)
  Nicole Bradtke /  Rachel McQuillan (third round)
  Laura Golarsa /  Kristine Radford (first round)

Qualifying

Draw

Finals

Top half

Section 1

Section 2

Bottom half

Section 3

Section 4

References

External links

1996 Wimbledon Championships on WTAtennis.com
1996 Wimbledon Championships – Women's draws and results at the International Tennis Federation

Women's Doubles
Wimbledon Championship by year – Women's doubles